The Chartres Lodging Group, LLC, is an advisory and investment firm focused on the property management, asset management, renovation and development of lodging assets. It has been responsible for over $9 billion of hospitality investments and assets comprising over 100 upscale and luxury hotels, resorts and conference centers. The company is currently responsible for a $4 billion, 12,000-room portfolio of luxury and upscale hotels, conference centers and resorts in the United States.

History
The company was founded in San Francisco by principal investors Rob Kline and Maki Bara.

In 2006, Chartres Lodging formed its own internal property management company, Kokua Hospitality, designed to provide additional property management resources.

Chartres' most significant acquisition was the purchase of the 4,867-room Adam's Mark hotel portfolio from HBE Corp., of St. Louis, and renovating, re-branding and repositioning plans for five properties encompassing high-profile, convention-oriented hotels in Dallas, Denver, St. Louis, Indianapolis and Buffalo.

The company's history of hotel investment includes the turnaround of various distressed properties including Inn of Chicago, DoubleTree by Hilton Chicago Magnificent Mile, the Allerton Hotel Chicago, Hyatt Place Waikiki Beach, and Hotel Novotel New York Times Square.

Current portfolio of hotels
Aloft Washington National Harbor, Maryland
DoubleTree by Hilton Chicago Magnificent Mile, Illinois
Embassy Suites Baltimore Inner Harbor and Grand Historic Venue, Maryland
Hilton Omaha, Nebraska
Hyatt Regency Jacksonville Riverfront Jacksonville, Florida
Hyatt Regency St. Louis at The Arch, Missouri
Inn of Chicago Magnificent Mile Chicago, Illinois
The National Conference Center, Lansdowne, Virginia
Novotel New York Times Square, New York City
Radisson Blu, Minneapolis
Radisson Lexington New York City, New York
Sheraton Dallas, Texas
Sheraton Denver, Colorado

Previously owned properties
The Allerton Hotel, Chicago, Illinois
DoubleTree by Hilton Metropolitan Hotel, New York City, New York
Hyatt Place Waikiki Beach, Hawaii
Pan Pacific San Francisco, California
Sir Francis Drake, California

Previously owned properties in Japan
Alivila Nikko Resort Okinawa
Fusaki Resort Village Ishigaki
Hineno Station Hotel Osaka
Hotel Centraza Hakata Fukuoka
Hotel Ishigakijima Ishigaki
Hotel Karuizawa 1130 Karuizawa
Hotel Nikko Chitose
Hotel Nikko Narita
Hotel Nikko Tokyo
Hotel Paco Asahikawa
Hotel Paco Kushiro
Hotel Paco Obihiro
Kushiro ANA Hotel Kushiro
Hotel Universal Port Universal Studios
Namba Oriental Hotel Osaka
Nikko Hotel Kawasaki
Oriental Hotel Hiroshima
Oriental Meriken Park Kobe
Royal Pines Hotel Moriguchi Osaka
Royal Pines Hotel Urawa Saitama
Royal Pines Hotel Wakayama
Shin-Urayasu Oriental Tokyo Disneyland

References

External links
Official website

Companies based in San Francisco
Hospitality companies of the United States